T-Connection was a funk and disco group from Nassau, the Bahamas, who scored two hits on the Billboard Hot 100 between 1977 and 1979. They did better on the US Hot Dance Music/Club Play chart, where they had five Top 10 hits, including "Do What You Wanna Do", which reached  #1, and "Everything Is Cool", which peaked at #10 on the US Billboard R&B chart. In the United Kingdom, they scored five entries in the UK Singles Chart, with "Do What You Wanna Do" their highest placed success at #11.

Their track "Groove to Get Down" has been heavily sampled due to its inclusion on the 1986 Ultimate Breaks and Beats series.

Group members included the brothers Theophilus "T" and Kirkwood Coakley, plus guitarists David Mackey and Monty Brown and drummer Anthony Flowers.

Discography

Albums
 Magic (TK Records, 1977)
 On Fire (TK Records, 1978)
 T-Connection (TK Records, 1978)
 Totally Connected (TK Records, 1980) 
 Everything Is Cool (Capitol, 1981) 
 Pure & Natural (Capitol, 1982) 
 The Game of Life (Capitol, 1983) 
 Take It to the Limit (Capitol, 1984)

Singles

See also
List of Billboard number-one dance club songs
List of artists who reached number one on the U.S. Dance Club Songs chart

References

External links

Disco groups
Bahamian musical groups